Temple Bar is the fifth studio album by English singer and musician John Waite, released by Imago in 1995. The album was produced by Mike Shipley.

The album's lead single, "How Did I Get By Without You" peaked at No. 89 on the US Billboard Hot 100 and remained on the chart for eight weeks. It also reached No. 20 on the Billboard Adult Contemporary chart. "Ain't No Sunshine" was also issued as a promotional single.

Background
After the release of his fourth studio album, Rover's Return, in 1987, Waite joined the supergroup Bad English. When Waite left the group in 1991, he took some time away from the music business before returning to his solo career. He told The Record in 1995: "Being in Bad English was too much of a compromise. Instead of being true to the artistic side, there was this incredible pressure to keep producing the same kind of hits."

Waite's return to his solo career was based on his "pure love of the music", with the material on Temple Bar inspired by Waite's recent divorce: "I wanted to describe my life to me and to tell the truth". When Waite was offered a contract with Terry Ellis' new label Imago, Waite agreed on the condition that the album he made "wouldn't be a rock record". Speaking of the period on his official website, Waite recalled: "Terry Ellis gave me generous deal and I was able to move back into the city for several months to record. It's the only time I've ever had the head of a company tell me to make the record I wanted to make. I did. Temple Bar was the best I'd done to that point."

Reception

Upon release, Stephanie Riefe of the Hartford Courant described the album as an "accessible, easy listen" and wrote: "Temple Bar is full of trademark Waite touches: great turns of phrase and truckloads of sentimentality. The surprise is that it's good. The music is pleasing, and the lyrics aren't so fluffy that they float off the page." Brian S. Maloney of the Santa Cruz Sentinel considered the album to be "much more promising" than the material produced by Bad English. He commented: "The sincerity has returned and his solo music is more three-dimensional than those bland recent collaborations. It does go to show that sometimes old rockers still have a trick or two up their sleeves."

Track listing

Personnel 

 John Waite – lead vocals, rhythm guitar (3), backing vocals (8), bass (10)
 Shane Fontayne – electric guitar (1, 3, 4, 6), acoustic guitar (3, 4), guitars (5, 8-10)
 Jack Johnson – electric guitar (1, 6)
 Nick Moroch – acoustic guitar (1, 6)
 Chuck Kentis – acoustic guitar (2), strings (2, 5), keyboards (4, 6), acoustic piano (5)
 Jeff Golub – guitars (2), dobro (7)
 Tim Pierce – electric guitar (6), guitars (10)
 Erik Sanko – bass (1, 2)
 Donnie Nossov – bass (3, 4, 8)
 John DeNicola – bass (6)
 Tony Beard – drums (1-4, 6, 8)
 Jimmy Keegan – drums (10)
 Michael Fisher – tambourine (3, 4, 8)
 Mark Spiro – backing vocals (1, 10), acoustic guitar (10)
 Tommy Funderburk – backing vocals (8)

Production
 Mike Shipley – producer, mixing
 Mark Spiro – producer (10)
 John Waite – producer (10), arrangements
 Tony Phillips – engineer
 Dan Marnien – additional engineer
 Donal Bray – assistant engineer 
 Eric Flickinger – assistant engineer
 Tim Gerron – assistant engineer 
 Jen Monnar – assistant engineer
 George Marino – mastering at Sterling Sound (New York, NY)
 Alastair Thain – photography
 Gold Mountain Entertainment – management

References

1995 albums
John Waite albums
Imago Records albums
Albums produced by Mike Shipley